Genius Brands International (GBI) is an entertainment company headed by Andy Heyward.  The company was formed from the merger of Genius Brands International and A Squared Entertainment.

History

2014–2015
Genius Brands International (GBI) was formed in November 2013 from the merger between A2 Entertainment and pre-merger Genius Brands (former Pacific Entertainment), with the Heywards of A2 taking over as top executives. Pre-merged Genius Brands CEO Klaus Moeller moved to vice president of special markets at GBI. GBI's board of directors included former California governor Gray Davis and American Greetings Corp. president-COO Jeff Weiss.

The Baby Genius video on demand subscription service launched in April 2014. GBI launched a VOD channel of children's entertainment called Kid Genius in October 2015, through Comcast's Xfinity On Demand.

In June 2014, Genius Brands agreed to license Baby Genius, Secret Millionaires Club and Thomas Edison's Secret Lab to LeapFrog Enterprises for kids' learning tablets. The first few Leap Frog tablet apps from the deal were released in December 2014, with two for both Baby Genius and Secret Millionaires Club.

GBI issued and sold 4.3 million shares of stock and warrants in November 2014 to investors and management at par $1. The raised working capital would be used for brand marketing, new property acquisition and development and the Kid Genius channel.

2016–2019
Penguin Young Readers and author/illustrator Anna Dewdney signed an agreement with Genius to develop animated content and manage licensing for the Llama Llama franchise in February 2016. The products, from apparel to toys, are slated to arrive in 2016.

In February 2016, Genius Brands and Sony Pictures Home Entertainment announced a multi-year marketing and distribution agreement for four existing properties plus three under development. Existing properties under the deal are SpacePop, a new original Baby Genius series, Secret Millionaires Club and Stan Lee's Mighty 7. The new Baby Genius series would be relaunched on Amazon.com in September.

The company paired for another Sony agreement in April 2016. This agreement was with Sony Music Entertainment's Legacy Recordings for the Genius Brands Music label. The label would have two age-focused imprints, for toddlers, Baby Genius, and children-to-tweens, Kid Genius.

In September 2016, GBI had teamed up with Rob Minkoff and Shane Morris on a preschool animated series. The series is Rainbow Rangers, featuring others of the rainbow magical girls, who protect the earth. Main designed were by Brittany Myers and Ruben Aquino. At the time, the company expect to have the concept debut as a third quarter 2017 special and a full series start in second quarter 2018.

Kid Genius channel expanded to a small network of on demand channels with its offerings first on Comcast on Demand with a Baby Genius TV channel. The company launched Kid Genius Cartoons Plus! on Amazon Channels starting on September 28, 2017. Plus included all GBI programming plus other acquired programming. Genius Brands Network in July 2019 added content from kids gaming company Tankee to its channels.

In January 2017, Sony Pictures Home Entertainment expanded its distribution deal to all properties and took an equity stake in Genius Brands. In November 2017, the company filed with the SEC to resell 1.65 million shares of stock.

Genius issued a convertible debt round bringing in $4.5 million in August 2018 which was led by financier Robert Wolf of 32 Ventures and was oversubscribed bringing in both existing and new investors. In September 2018, Bank Lemi extended a $6 million bank facility allowing Genius to produce a second season of Llama Llama.

2020–present
In May 2020, the company's stock value jumped 2000% with four announced stock sales that month, after being put on notice by NASDAQ for low share value, which might have triggered delisting. The reason for the jump was the company's announcement of the launch date of its Kartoon Channel, and Mattel's Rainbow Rangers toys gaining shelf space at Wal-Mart in summer 2020. With an announcement of registering a stockholder stock sale on June 4, the stock broke its run up with a 13% drop. Kartoon Channel, which is the merger of its existing channels, launched on June 15, 2020, on four more platforms.

On July 6, 2020, Genius Brands acquired exclusive worldwide rights to use Stan Lee's name, physical likeness and signature from POW! Entertainment as well as licensing rights to his name and over 100 of POW's original IPs. The assets will be placed under a new joint-venture with POW!, called Stan Lee Universe, managed by Genius. Michael E. Uslan was hired to advise Genius on Lee Universe film and TV projects. Genius then arranged a publishing deal with Archie Comics for Stan Lee Universe comic book imprint starting with Kindergarten Cop adaptation title.

On October 27, 2021, Genius announced they would acquire the Canada-based Wow Unlimited Media for $53 Million, allowing Genius to expand to the country. The transaction was slated to be completed in Q1 2022, pending regulatory approval. The acquisition was completed on April 7 of that year.

On January 4, 2023, Genius Brands announced that they would sell a 50% stake in the Frederator shows Bravest Warriors, Bee and PuppyCat and then-upcoming series Catbug to Japanese company Toho International. The deal would allow the two companies to provide frameworks, to co-produce new content based on the properties and develop consumer product campaigns. Toho would also gain Asian distribution rights to the properties.

Background
A2 Squared Background
Some of future A Squared Entertainment properties originated at Andy Heyward's previous company, DIC Entertainment. DIC signed a TV series production deal in July 2003 with Stan Lee's POW! Entertainment for Stan Lee's Secret Super Six. In 2006, DIC was in development on Secret Millionaires Club with Berkshire Hathaway chairman Warren Buffett.

A Squared EntertainmentA Squared Entertainment (A2, A Squared) was formed by Heyward and his wife, Amy Moynihan Heyward, in 2009 as an animation company. The company had an initial four-show celebrity-inspired cartoon slate to be seen on AOL starting in Q4 2009 with the last starting in 2010. The four shows would then switch from a webisode format of 26 episodes of three-to-five-minute to TV with 13 22-minute shows. The slate then consisted of Secret Millionaires Club, GiGi and The Green Team (working title),  Little Martha (working title) and Kosmos. Kosmos was a series to be based on Carl Sagan's life as a famous astronomer. A2's first animated program was Secret Millionaires Club, which features an animated Buffett as a secret mentor to a group of enterprising children. Also, Martha & Friends with Martha Stewart and Gisele & the Green Team with Gisele Bundchen were created and launched by A Square.

In February 2010, A2 partnered with POW! Entertainment and Archie Comics to create the Stan Lee Comics joint venture for the Stan Lee's Super Seven franchise. On December 7, 2010, A Squared launched Gisele & The Green Team webseries in conjunction with AOLkids.com and Gisele Bündchen.

In April 2012, Stan Lee's Mighty 7 was slated to be developed for other media formats via A Squared Elxsi Entertainment LLC (A2E2).  A2E2 was a joint-venture between A Squared Entertainment (A2) and Tata Elxsi formed in January 2011 which Elxsi ends in October 2012. Also in 2012, A2 took over Archies' ownership stake in Stan Lee Comics.

By November 2013, A2''' had Thomas Edison's Secret Lab in development.

Pacific Entertainment
Pacific Entertainment Corporation was founded by Baby Genius creators Klaus Moeller and Larry Balaban in 2006. In January 2006, Pacific Entertainment purchased Baby Genius and other lines from Genius Products, Inc. for $3 million. The other lines were preschool brands such as Wee Worship and the Little Tikes music and DVD series. Genius Products retained exclusive U.S. distribution rights for the lines.

GBI licensed Baby Genius in January 2011 to Jakks Pacific's Tollytots division for a musical and early learning toy line. At Toy Fair 2012, Tollytots introduced the line with 20 products.

In December 2011, Pacific Entertainment Corporation changed its name to Genius Brands International, Inc. (GBI). Genius Brands digitized its Baby Genius book line in July 2013 via a deal with Graphicly.

Units
A Squared Entertainment LLC: is Genius Brand's brand management and licensing subsidiary.
Genius Brands Music, music label with two imprints, Baby Genius, Kid Genius
Stan Lee Comics LLC: a joint venture with POW! Entertainment currently only for the Stan Lee's Mighty 7 franchise
Kartoon Channel, formerly Kid Genius Network (-2020)
Kid Genius Cartoon Channel (defunct)
Baby Genius TV (defunct)
Kid Genius Cartoons Plus! (defunct)

Kartoon Channel

Kartoon Channel, formerly Kid Genius Channel, is a video on demand channel owned by Genius Brands.

The Kid Genius Channel was launched by GBI with children's entertainment in October 2015, through Comcast's Xfinity On Demand. Debra Pierson was named general manager for the channel in March 2016. In December 2016, Margaret Loesch was named Executive Chairman of the Kids Genius Channel with Pierson promoted to channel president. The channel was added to several over-the-top media services including Roku, Apple TV and Amazon Fire, the week of February 2017.

Kartoon Channel, which is the merger of its existing channels, was announced to be launched on June 15, 2020, on four more platforms. Loesch would carry over from Kid Genius Network as executive chair, while adding former president of Walt Disney Television production company David Neuman as chief creative officer of the streaming service.

Programming
InitialStan Lee's Mighty 7 (Plus!)Where on Earth Is Carmen Sandiego?Dennis the MenaceLater acquiredEddie Is a Yeti (Plus!)Nancy Drew Codes & CluesLaGolda, a UnitedHealthcare production of a soccer bilingual animated children's series (Plus!)
Baby Genius TVThe Adventures of Paddington BearRainbow Valley Fire DepartmentBaby ProdigyIgloo-GlooPirates Adventures in ArtSo! SmartTodd WorldBaby Genius Nursery RhymesBaby Genius AnimalsPlus!Inspector Gadget Liberty's KidsDinoSquadCarl SquaredHeads UpThe Day Henry MetSo Smart!Baby ProdigyHappy Kids''

Production library

References

External links

2013 establishments in California
Companies based in Beverly Hills, California
American companies established in 2013
Companies listed on the Nasdaq
Entertainment companies established in 2013
Television production companies of the United States